EP Aviation based in McLean, Virginia, is an aviation company owned by Academi (formerly Blackwater Security). Assets may include an Embraer Super Tucano and 28 other aircraft including eight SA330J Puma and 14 Bell 412 helicopters. Blackwater has another affiliate known as Presidential Airways which also has a number of registered aircraft. The Pumas were former Bundespolizei and were purchased from HELOG. EP Aviation is active in Afghanistan and Iraq.

EP Aviation is named for Blackwater's owner, Erik Prince.

Fleet
The EP Aviation fleet includes the following aircraft (as of August 2016):

The airline fleet also included the following aircraft (as of October 2011):
 14 Bell 412 helicopters
 3 Hughes/MD 369 "Little Bird" helicopters
 4 Bell 214ST medium-lift helicopters
 3 Fairchild Swearingen Merlin IIIC turboprop airliners
 9 Aérospatiale Puma utility helicopters
 1 Maule Air MT-7-235 STOL aircraft
 1 Embraer EMB 314 Super Tucano counterinsurgency aircraft
 1 Mooney M20E fixed wing aircraft.

Incidents and accidents

SA.330J (c/n 1358) N605R, ditched "somewhere in Afghanistan" around 15 December 2008 and there is damage to its tailrotor.

See also
Aviation Worldwide Services an affiliated company

References

External links
 List of Honeywell modified EP Aviation airframes

Airlines based in Virginia
Companies based in Virginia